Diyala Sports Club, is an Iraqi football club based in Diyala, that plays in Iraq Division one.

History

in Premier League
Diyala club played in the Iraqi Premier League for the first time in the 1975–76 season, and was relegated at the end of the season to the Iraq Division One. The total seasons that the team played in the Premier League reached 14 seasons until the 2010–11 season, during which it was relegated 4 times, and withdrew twice.

Managerial history
  Safaa Adnan
  Hazem Saleh
  Ali Abdullah

See also 
 2021–22 Iraq FA Cup
 2022–23 Iraq FA Cup

References

External links
 Diyala SC on Goalzz.com
 Iraq Clubs- Foundation Dates

1957 establishments in Iraq
Football clubs in Diyala